Utica Canal Terminal Harbor, commonly known as Utica Harbor, is a small man-made harbor in Utica, Oneida County, New York. The harbor was once connected to the Mohawk River and the Erie Canal by the Utica Harbor Lock, which is now permanently closed and used only for flood control.

References

External links

Mohawk River
Erie Canal